XHUCT-FM is a radio station serving Torreón, Coahuila owned by the Universidad Autónoma de Coahuila. It is branded as Radio Universidad and broadcasts on 89.5 FM from its campus.

The station came to air on March 7, 2013.

It shares programming with XHUACS-FM 104.1 in Saltillo, which is the other radio station operated by the university.

References

Radio stations in Coahuila
Mass media in Torreón
University radio stations in Mexico
Radio stations in the Comarca Lagunera